The 2012 NAIA Independents football season is made up of seventeen United States college athletic programs that compete without any conference affiliation as NAIA independent football schools under the National Association of Intercollegiate Athletics (NAIA) for the 2012 college football season.  No conference champion is declared.  The team with the best record was the Robert Morris Eagles with eight wins and three losses, followed by Valley City State Vikings at seven wins and three losses.  

None of the independent teams advanced to the 2012 NAIA Football National Championship.

References

Independent